Beaufortia  is a genus of woody shrubs and small trees in the family Myrtaceae and is endemic to Southwest Australia. The genus Beaufortia is closely related to Melaleuca, Calothamnus, Regelia and several others, differing mainly in the way the anthers are attached to the stalks of the stamens, and in the way they open to release their pollen. Beaufortia anthers are attached at one end and open by splitting at the other.

Description
Plants in the genus Beaufortia, sometimes commonly known as bottlebrush are evergreen shrubs with very small, glandular, aromatic leaves usually oppositely arranged. Most are andromonoecious, meaning they have both male and bisexual flowers on one plant. The flowers are in spikelike or headlike inflorescences. The flower has five triangular sepals and five white, yellow, red, pink, or purple petals, which are sometimes hairy. The petals usually fall off as the flower opens, or shortly after that. The stamens are red or deep pink, arranged in five bundles and extend well beyond the petals, giving the inflorescence its colour. Unlike other closely related genera such as Melaleuca, the anthers are attached to the filament at their base and release their pollen through two curved slits on the other end. Flowering in most species occurs throughout the year but mostly between late spring and autumn. The fruit is a dehiscent capsule with three valves, each holding a winged seed.<ref name=FloraBase>{{FloraBase|name = Beaufortia’'|id =21813}}</ref>

Taxonomy and naming
The first formal description of the genus Beaufortia was published in 1812 by Robert Brown in William Aiton's Hortus Kewensis. It was followed by a description of the first-named species, Beaufortia decussata. The genus was named for the English gardener and botanist Mary Somerset, Duchess of Beaufort. In Curtis's Botanical Magazine it is noted that "her grace possessed a flourishing botanical garden at her seat, at Badminton, in Gloucestershire".
Some taxonomists have suggested that Beaufortia along with Calothamnus, Conothamnus, Eremaea, Lamarchea, Petraeomyrtus,  Phymatocarpus and Regelia should be included in the genus Melaleuca but the change has not been adopted by most herbaria.

Distribution and habitat
All species of Beaufortia occur in the South West Botanical Province and about half the species also occur in the Eremaean province. Beaufortias are often found in sand plain and in heath, although Beaufortia sparsa usually grows in marshy places and is known by the common name swamp bottlebrush.

Ecology
Most beaufortias are serotinous, only reproducing from seed, released from the fruit after fire. Several species which occur in areas where fire is frequent, have a lignotuber which resprouts after fire. Honeyeaters (Family Meliphagidae) and the honey possum (Tarsipes rostratus) are thought to be the main pollinators but many kinds of insect have also been recorded on beaufortia flowers.

Conservation
Some species of Beaufortia are common within their range but several, including Beaufortia bicolor are classified as "Priority Three" by the Western Australian Government Department of Parks and Wildlife, meaning that they is poorly known and known from only a few locations but is not under imminent threat.

Use in cultivation
All the species of Beaufortia are worth trialling in the garden but few have been grown successfully in eastern Australia. They require full sun and excellent drainage and benefit from being grown over limestone. Grafting onto Kunzea ambigua may also improve the chance of success.

Species list
The following is a list of the 22 species of Beaufortia recognised by the Australian Plant Census and Western Australian Herbarium as at March 2020:

 Beaufortia aestiva K.J.Brooks  – Kalbarri beaufortia      
 Beaufortia anisandra Schauer  – dark beaufortia           
 Beaufortia bicolor Strid  - Badgingarra beaufortia
 Beaufortia bracteosa Diels  
 Beaufortia burbidgeae A.A.Burb. – column beaufortia       
 Beaufortia cyrtodonta (Turcz.) Benth. – Stirling Range beaufortia       
 Beaufortia decussata R.Br.  – gravel bottlebrush             
 Beaufortia elegans Schauer – elegant beaufortia
 Beaufortia empetrifolia (Rchb.) Schauer – south coast beaufortia
 Beaufortia eriocephala W.Fitzg.  – woolly beaufortia              
 Beaufortia incana (Benth.) A.S.George  –grey-leaved beaufortia
 Beaufortia kwongkanicola  A.A.Burb. – Lesueur beaufortia
 Beaufortia macrostemon Lindl.  – Darling Range beaufortia
 Beaufortia micrantha Schauer – small-leaved beaufortia
 Beaufortia orbifolia F.Muell.  – Ravensthorpe bottlebrush
 Beaufortia puberula Turcz.  – hairy-leaved beaufortia
 Beaufortia purpurea Lindl.  – purple beaufortia
 Beaufortia raggedensis A.A.Burb. Mount Ragged beaufortia
 Beaufortia schaueri Schauer – pink beaufortia
 Beaufortia sparsa R.Br.  – swamp bottlebrush 
 Beaufortia sprengelioides (DC.) Craven  – Shark Bay beaufortia
 Beaufortia squarrosa'' Schauer – sand bottlebrush

References

 
Myrtaceae genera